The grey silky-flycatcher or grey silky flycatcher (Ptiliogonys cinereus), is a species of bird in the family Ptiliogonatidae.
It is usually found only in Guatemala and Mexico, but vagrants have turned up in the southern United States.
It is found in montane forest and adjacent scrub, both mesic and xeric.

References

External links

Image at ADW

grey silky-flycatcher
Birds of Guatemala
Birds of Mexico
grey silky-flycatcher
Taxonomy articles created by Polbot
Birds of the Sierra Madre Occidental
Birds of the Sierra Madre Oriental
Birds of the Sierra Madre del Sur
Birds of the Trans-Mexican Volcanic Belt